The 1920 Bavarian state election was held on 6 June 1920 to elect the 155 members of the Landtag of Bavaria.

Results

Members from Coburg 
Following the incorporation of Coburg into Bavaria, the Coburg Landtag elected two Social Democratic Party members and one German Democratic Party member to join the Bavarian Landtag from 1 July 1920.

A by-election was held in Coburg on 7 November 1920 to elect the region's three members to the Bavarian Landtag.

References 

Bavaria
1920
June 1920 events
November 1920 events